Ariel Zeitoun (born 26 September 1949) is a French director, producer, and screenwriter. 

Later, he wrote the script for and directed Souvenirs, souvenirs.

In 2013 Zeitoun directed the historical drama Angélique, loosely based on the book of "Angélique, the Marquise of the Angels" by Anne Golon, which earned him international recognition by the critics and the public alike.

Filmography 
 1984 : Souvenirs, Souvenirs
 1987 : Saxo
 1988 : L'enfance de l'art (producer)
 1990 : Baby Blood (producer)
 1993 : Le Nombril du monde
 1997 : Une femme très très très amoureuse 
 1997 : XXL
 1998 : Bimboland
 2001 : Yamakasi
 2007 : Le Dernier Gang
 2013 : Angélique

References

External links 

 bio at AlloCiné

1945 births
Living people
French film directors
French Jews
Tunisian Jews
French people of Tunisian-Jewish descent
Tunisian emigrants to France